Ypsolopha blandella is a moth of the family Ypsolophidae. It has been recorded from Amur Oblast in Russia, and from Estonia, Latvia, Spain, Japan, Korea and China.

The wingspan is 20–22 mm.

References

Ypsolophidae
Moths of Europe
Moths of Asia